Manuel Delgado Barreto (1879–1936) was a Spanish journalist and Far right politician.

Early career 

Delgado founded the literary magazine Gente Nueva and the newspaper La Opinión.  In 1901 he settled in Madrid, holding the position of editor of El Globo.  Delgado later moved to La Correspondencia de España, where he used the pseudonym of "Taf".

References

See also
List of journalists killed in Europe

Spanish journalists
1879 births
1936 deaths
People killed by the Second Spanish Republic
People from San Cristóbal de La Laguna
Writers from the Canary Islands
Executed Spanish people
Far-right politicians in Spain